Herbert "Herbie" Martin (4 May 1927 – 18 February 2014) was a Northern Ireland-born cricketer and rugby union player. He was a right-handed batsman.

Martin represented Ireland in 19 first-class matches, scoring 671 runs at an average of 19.17 with a high score of 88. Martin made 5 half centuries for Ireland. Domestically, he played for Lisburn Cricket Club, joining in 1938. Outside of cricket Martin also played Rugby for the Instonians and Ulster as well as playing hockey for Ulster Schools'.

See also
 List of Irish cricket and rugby union players

References

External links
Herbert Martin at CricketArchive

1927 births
2014 deaths
Sportspeople from Lisburn
Irish cricketers
Irish rugby union players
Ulster Rugby players
Instonians rugby union players
Cricketers from Northern Ireland
Lisburn Cricket Club players